Mateusz Szczepaniak (born 23 January 1991) is a Polish former professional footballer who played as a striker.

References

External links
 
 

1991 births
Living people
Association football forwards
Polish footballers
Polish expatriate footballers
AJ Auxerre players
Zagłębie Lubin players
KS Polkowice players
Miedź Legnica players
Podbeskidzie Bielsko-Biała players
MKS Cracovia (football) players
Piast Gliwice players
Warta Poznań players
Enosis Neon Paralimni FC players
Ekstraklasa players
I liga players
II liga players
Championnat National 2 players
Cypriot First Division players
People from Lubin
Polish expatriate sportspeople in France
Polish expatriate sportspeople in Cyprus
Expatriate footballers in France
Expatriate footballers in Cyprus